Jim Davies is Professor of Software Engineering and current Director of the Software Engineering Programme at the University of Oxford, England.

Biography 
Jim Davies studied mathematics at New College, Oxford, joining the Oxford University Computing Laboratory (now the Oxford University Department of Computer Science) in 1986 for a Masters' and Doctorate. After working as a researcher and lecturer in computer science, at Oxford, Reading, and Royal Holloway, University of London, he became a lecturer in software engineering at Oxford in 1995. He has led the Software Engineering Programme since 2000, and was made Professor of Software Engineering in 2006.

Davies is an expert in formal methods, including Communicating Sequential Processes (CSP) and the Z notation.

Books 
 Jim Davies, Specification and Proof in Real Time CSP. Cambridge University Press, 1993. .
 Jim Woodcock and Jim Davies, Using Z: Specification, Refinement, and Proof. Prentice-Hall International Series in Computer Science, 1996. .
 Jim Davies, Bill Roscoe,  and Jim Woodcock, Millennial Perspectives in Computer Science: Proceedings of the 1999 Oxford-Microsoft Symposium in Honour of Sir Tony Hoare. Palgrave Macmillan, Cornerstones of Computing, 2000. .

References

Year of birth missing (living people)
Living people
Alumni of New College, Oxford
Academics of Royal Holloway, University of London
Academics of the University of Reading
Members of the Department of Computer Science, University of Oxford
Fellows of Kellogg College, Oxford
English computer scientists
Formal methods people
Computer science writers
British textbook writers